Plumegesta is a genus of moths of the family Crambidae.

Species
Plumegesta callidalis 
Plumegesta largalis Munroe, 1972

References

Natural History Museum Lepidoptera genus database

Glaphyriinae
Crambidae genera
Taxa named by Eugene G. Munroe